= The Invisible Edge =

2009 book by Blaxill and Eckardt

The Invisible Edge: Taking Your Strategy to the Next Level Using Intellectual Property
- Author: Mark Blaxill and Ralph Eckardt
- Subject: Intellectual Property
- Genre: Business
- Publication date: 2009

The Invisible Edge: Taking Your Strategy to the Next Level Using Intellectual Property is a 2009 business book written by authors Mark Blaxill and Ralph Eckardt that focuses on the unappreciated value of intellectual property and how it can be harnessed by firms to create sustainable advantages.
